Władysław Hipolit Segda (23 May 1895 – 1994) was a Polish fencer and military officer. He won a bronze medal in the team sabre event at the 1928 and 1932 Summer Olympics.

Segda served in the Austrian Army during World War I. Since 1918 he served in the Polish Army. He later fought in the September Campaign of World War II and eventually served in the Polish Armed Forces in the West. After war he remained in emigration. Polish stage, film, TV actress Dorota Segda is his granddaughter.

References

External links
 Profile at the Polish Olympic Committee

1895 births
1994 deaths
Polish male fencers
Olympic fencers of Poland
Fencers at the 1928 Summer Olympics
Fencers at the 1932 Summer Olympics
Fencers at the 1936 Summer Olympics
Olympic bronze medalists for Poland
People from Przemyśl
Polish Austro-Hungarians
People from the Kingdom of Galicia and Lodomeria
Austro-Hungarian military personnel of World War I
Polish people of World War I
Polish military personnel of World War II
Olympic medalists in fencing
Medalists at the 1928 Summer Olympics
Medalists at the 1932 Summer Olympics
Sportspeople from Podkarpackie Voivodeship